201st Brigade may refer to:

201st (2/1st Middlesex) Brigade Second Line formation of the British Territorial Force during World War I
201st Independent Infantry Brigade (Home) British Army Home Defence formation during World War II
201st Guards Motor Brigade British Army field formation during World War II
201st Battlefield Surveillance Brigade US Army formation

Brigades